Frank Nappi (born February 27, 1967) is an American author, lyricist and high school English teacher.

Works 
Nappi's novels include: 
Echoes From The Infantry, winner of the Military Writers Society of America's Silver Medal for Outstanding Fiction in 2006, 
The Legend of Mickey Tussler,  which was adapted for a television movie called A Mile in His Shoes starring Dean Cain), 
Sophomore Campaign, the sequel to Mickey Tussler,
Nobody Has To Know, a psychological thriller that author Nelson DeMille called "A haunting, briskly-paced page turner that explores the darkest recesses of the human psyche while propelling the reader through an intricate series of hair-raising twists and turns. Nobody Has to Know is a masterfully written tale that is expertly told. Frank Nappi knows how to entertain the reader from start to finish."  
Welcome to the Show, was released by Skyhorse Publishing in the spring of 2016. Bill Madden of the New York Daily News said of WTS, "...it is an action-packed, heart-warming story that completes the most captivating baseball trilogy ever written." The book was also designated as a "Read Across America Day" selection by Newsday and News 12 Long Island. 
I Became an Elementary School Outlaw, Nappi's first memoir which author John Owens called "warm witty and wise" was released in  July 2019.

Nappi collaborated with MP Music House in Nashville in the fall of 2017 to produce the song "Buckle Up and Dig In" as part of the celebration of the 10th anniversary of the Mickey Tussler series release.  He has since written several songs for MP Music House, including singles "Hey Jay," "The Words Were Right There," and the track "Daddy Wrote The Music" which appeared on the album Heroes Welcome in 2018. Nappi is also credited with the writing of several songs for breakthrough country music artist Atticus Jones, including "Still Above The Ground," "I Wish I Was a Jerk," "Broken Pieces," "I Wonder," "One," "Saltwater Walking", "Walk with Me" and "P-A-I-N", all singles released by MP Music House in 2019. Nappi is also credited with the writing of several songs for upstart jazz artist Tom Petrone, including 2020 releases "Fly Again," "Let's Get Lost," and "One Terrific Christmas Day" and 2021 releases "If I Said I Love You," "That Kind of Summer," "Seaside Serenade" and "Magic."

Personal life 
Nappi resides in Port Jefferson, New York. He attended Farmingdale High School in Farmingdale, New York, and graduated from Hofstra University and SUNY Stony Brook. Nappi has taught English and creative writing for 34 years at Oceanside High School in Oceanside, New York. Nappi is married to Victoria (Heydenreich) Nappi and has two sons, Nicholas and Anthony, from a previous marriage.

Books 
 Echoes from the Infantry (2005)
 The Legend of Mickey Tussler (2008)
 The Legend of Mickey Tussler: Sophomore Campaign (2012)
 Nobody Has to Know (2012)
 The Legend of Mickey Tussler: Welcome to the Show (2016)
 I Became an Elementary School Outlaw (2019)

Songs 

 "Buckle Up and Dig In" (2017)
 "Hey Jay" (2018)
 "Daddy Wrote The Music" (2018)
 "The Words Were Right There" (2018) 
 "Still Above the Ground" (2019) 
 "I Wish I Was a Jerk" (2019) 
 "Broken Pieces" (2019) 
 "I Wonder" (2019) 
 "One" (2019) 
 "Saltwater Walking" (2019) 
 "Walk with Me" (2019) 
 "P-A-I-N" (Pieces of Me All In Need) (2019)
 "Fly Again" (2020)
 "Let's Get Lost" (2020)
 "One Terrific Christmas Day" (2020)
 "If I Said I Love You" (2021)
 "That Kind of Summer" (2021)
 "Seaside Serenade" (2021)
 "Magic" (2021)

Films/TV 
 A Mile in His Shoes - the 2011 adaptation of The Legend of Mickey Tussler

References

External links 
 
  Nappi at National Baseball Hall of Fame  (2014)

1967 births
Living people
People from Massapequa, New York
People from Farmingdale, New York
People from Oceanside, New York
American male writers
Teachers of English
Farmingdale High School alumni
Schoolteachers from New York (state)